Akhalaia is a Georgian surname. Notable people with the surname include:

Bacho Akhalaia (born 1980), Georgian politician 
Vladimir Akhalaia (born 1982), Georgian footballer

Georgian-language surnames
Surnames of Abkhazian origin